Valery Alexeev (born 1964) is an American mathematician who is currently the David C. Barrow Professor at University of Georgia and an Elected Fellow of the American Mathematical Society. He received his Ph.D from Lomonosov Moscow State University in 1990.

References

 

Fellows of the American Mathematical Society
20th-century American mathematicians
1964 births
Living people
21st-century American mathematicians